The Washington Township Schools are a community public school district that serves students in pre-kindergarten through eighth grade from Washington Township, in Morris County, New Jersey, United States.

As of the 2020–21 school year, the district, comprised of four schools, had an enrollment of 1,938 students and 196.9 classroom teachers (on an FTE basis), for a student–teacher ratio of 9.8:1.

The district is classified by the New Jersey Department of Education as being in District Factor Group "I", the second-highest of eight groupings. District Factor Groups organize districts statewide to allow comparison by common socioeconomic characteristics of the local districts. From lowest socioeconomic status to highest, the categories are A, B, CD, DE, FG, GH, I and J.

Students in public school for ninth through twelfth grades attend West Morris Central High School, which is located in the township, but has a Chester mailing address. The school is part of the West Morris Regional High School District, which also serves students from the surrounding Morris County school districts of Chester Borough, Chester Township, Mendham Borough, Mendham Township, who attend West Morris Mendham High School. As of the 2020–21 school year, the high school had an enrollment of 1,098 students and 94.5 classroom teachers (on an FTE basis), for a student–teacher ratio of 11.6:1.

Schools
Schools in the district (with 2020–21 enrollment data from the National Center for Education Statistics) are:
Elementary schools
Benedict A. Cucinella Elementary School with 451 students in grades PreK-5
Melissa Keiser, Principal
Flocktown-Kossmann School with 442 students in grades PreK-5
Michael Craver, Principal
Old Farmers Road School with 310 students in grades K-5
Joseph Ciulla, Principal
Middle school
Long Valley Middle School with 720 students in grades 6-8
Mark Ippolito, Principal

Administration
Core members of the district's administration are:
Peter Turnamian, Superintendent 
Elizabeth George, Business Administrator / Board Secretary

Board of education
The district's board of education is comprised of nine members who set policy and oversee the fiscal and educational operation of the district through its administration. As a Type II school district, the board's trustees are elected directly by voters to serve three-year terms of office on a staggered basis, with three seats up for election each year held (since 2012) as part of the November general election. The board appoints a superintendent to oversee the district's day-to-day operations and a business administrator to supervise the business functions of the district.

References

External links
Washington Township Schools
 
School Data for the Washington Township Schools, National Center for Education Statistics
West Morris Central High School
West Morris Regional High School District

Washington Township, Morris County, New Jersey
New Jersey District Factor Group I
School districts in Morris County, New Jersey